is a former Japanese football player and manager.

Playing career
Kobayashi was born in Ayase on May 14, 1976. After graduating from Kokushikan University, he joined newly was promoted to J2 League club, FC Tokyo in 1999. Although the club was promoted to J1 League from 2000, he could not play at all in the match until 2000. He debuted in late 2001 and played several matches as right side back. Although he played as regular player in early 2002, he could hardly play in the match behind Akira Kaji from May 2002 and retired end of 2002 season.

Coaching career
After the retirement, Kobayashi started coaching career at FC Tokyo in 2005. He mainly coached youth team until 2011. In 2012, he moved to Júbilo Iwata and became a coach for top team. In August 2019, manager Hideto Suzuki resigned for health reasons and Kobayashi became a caretaker manager.

Club statistics

Managerial statistics

References

External links

1976 births
Living people
Kokushikan University alumni
People from Ayase, Kanagawa
Association football people from Kanagawa Prefecture
Japanese footballers
J1 League players
J2 League players
FC Tokyo players
Japanese football managers
J1 League managers
Júbilo Iwata managers
Association football defenders